Olivier Brandicourt (born 13 February 1956) is a French business executive and physician, and the former chief executive officer of Sanofi.

Career
Olivier Brandicourt studied medicine in Paris and specialized in infectious diseases and tropical medicine. He spent eight years with the Institute of Infectious and Tropical Diseases of the Pitié-Salpêtrière Hospital in Paris, where he focused on malaria research in West and Central Africa. Prior to that, he spent two years in the Republic of the Congo as a doctor.

He holds an Advanced Degree in Cellular and Immunological Pathophysiology (Paris Descartes University) and a master's degree in Biology (University of Paris XII).

Olivier Brandicourt was appointed CEO of Sanofi in February 2015.

Before that, between 2013 and 2015, he was chief executive officer and chairman of the board of management of Bayer HealthCare AG, where he was responsible for leading the company's healthcare portfolio globally, encompassing pharmaceuticals, consumer care, animal health and medical care businesses.

Brandicourt joined Pfizer in 2000, after its acquisition of Warner-Lambert/Parke-Davis, where he started his career, first in Medical Affairs and later in Marketing and Management. He spent 12 years at Pfizer Inc. where he held several senior positions across a range of disciplines, including President and General Manager of the Global Specialty Care and Primary Care businesses, and later as President and General Manager of the Primary Care Business Unit. He served as a member of the executive leadership team of Pfizer Inc. and oversaw the introduction of the cholesterol treatment Lipitor. In 2007, he was the supervisor of the failed launch of the Exubera.

In February 2015, Olivier Brandicourt was appointed as the chief executive officer of Sanofi. His golden handshake of US$4.5 million upon taking on the appointment was criticized by French Ministers Stéphane Le Foll and Ségolène Royal.

In November 2015, Sanofi announced its 2020 Strategic Plan that implies reshaping its activities into 3 portfolios: Diabetes, cardiovascular, and vaccines. In May 2016, Olivier Brandicourt announced a reshuffle in the company's management, in line with the 2020 Strategic Plan. In January 2017, Sanofi completed an asset swap of its animal health business, Merial, for Boehringer's consumer healthcare business, CHC. Subsequently, Sanofi launched a fifth Global Business Unit for Consumer Health Care.

Other tenures
 Member of the council of the International Federation of Pharmaceutical Manufacturers and Associations (IFPMA),
 Member of the Board of Management of the Pharmaceutical Research and Manufacturers of America (PhRMA).
 Vice-President of the European Federation of Pharmaceutical Industries and Associations (EFPIA); 
 Honorary Fellow of the Royal College of Physicians in London
 Trustee of the Children's Aid Society in New York.

References

1956 births
Living people
French businesspeople
French healthcare chief executives
French tropical physicians
Pfizer people
Sanofi people
Bayer people
People from Casablanca